Stephen Michael Huntz (born December 3, 1945, at Cleveland, Ohio) is a retired American professional baseball player who played infielder in the Major Leagues between  and  for the St. Louis Cardinals, Chicago White Sox and San Diego Padres. He attended Villanova University.

Huntz' professional career extended for 13 seasons (1964; 1966–1977), and he played more than 1,000 games at the Triple-A level of minor league baseball — mostly in the Pacific Coast League. The bulk of his Major League playing time came as a utility infielder for the  Cardinals and the  Padres. He was traded along with Tommy John from the White Sox to the Los Angeles Dodgers for Dick Allen at the Winter Meetings on December 2, 1971.

Altogether, Huntz appeared in 237 Major League games. His 131 hits included 19 doubles, one triple and 16 home runs.

References

External links
, or Retrosheet

1945 births
Living people
Albuquerque Dukes players
Arkansas Travelers players
Baseball players from Ohio
Chicago White Sox players
Florida Instructional League Cardinals players
Fox Cities Foxes players
Hawaii Islanders players
Iowa Oaks players
Major League Baseball infielders
Salt Lake City Bees players
San Diego Padres players
St. Louis Cardinals players
Tigres de Aragua players
American expatriate baseball players in Venezuela
Tulsa Oilers (baseball) players
Tucson Toros players
Saint Ignatius High School (Cleveland) alumni
Villanova Wildcats baseball players